This is the filmography of Hong Kong singer, actor and film producer Andy Lau.

Career summary
Lau made his film acting debut in a supporting role the 1981 film, Once Upon a Rainbow and his television acting debut in an episode of the 1981 RTHK series, Til We Meet Again, in the leading role of "Dragon". The following year, Lau played a major role in director Ann Hui's Boat People, which earned him a Hong Kong Film Award for Best New Performer nomination, as well as starring in the TVB series, The Emissary, which shot him to stardom. In 1983, Lau starred as "Yeung Kuo" in The Return of the Condor Heroes, which was the top rated TV series of the year in Hong Kong, further boosting his popularity throughout Asia, and landed him the opportunity to star in his first leading film role in the action drama film, On the Wrong Track in the same year. Lau left TVB in 1985 to fully concentrate in his film career and starring in multiple box office hits before earning his first Hong Kong Film Award for Best Actor nomination for his role in the 1988 film, As Tears Go By, directed by Wong Kar-wai. In 1989 alone, Lau appeared in 16 films, including the top-grossing blockbuster of the year, God of Gamblers, as "Michael "Dagger" Chan", a role he would reprise in the sequel the following year.

In 1991, Lau established his own production company, Teamwork Motion Pictures, with its first production being the martial arts film, Saviour of the Soul, which Lau starred as a mercenary in the same year, being a critical and commercial success. Throughout the 1990s, Lau starred in over 50 films which include his signature role as "Wah Dee" in 1990's A Moment of Romance, the Lee Rock film series (1991) as real life corrupt officer Lui Lok, the 1992 wuxia film, Moon Warriors, the 1995 biker film, Full Throttle and the 1999 Johnnie To-directed action thriller film, Running Out of Time, which won him his first Hong Kong Film Award for Best Actor. In 1997, Lau also produced the Fruit Chan-directed drama film, Made in Hong Kong, which won the Hong Kong Film Award for Best Film.

In 2000, Lau starred as a Muay thai fighter in his 100th film, A Fighter's Blues, in which he also produced, and netted him the Golden Bauhinia Awards for Best Actor. In 2002, he starred as triad mole Lau Kin-ming in the highly acclaimed crime thriller, Infernal Affairs, a film considered to have "single-handedly revived the moribund Hong Kong film industry." Infernal Affairs grossed HK$55,057,176 at the Hong Kong box office, making it Lau's highest-grossing film in Hong Kong to date, and also earned Lau a Best Actor nomination both at the Hong Kong Film Awards and at the Golden Horse Awards. The following year, Lau starred in the sequel, Infernal Affairs III, which won him the Golden Horse Award for Best Leading Actor, and in the Buddhism-themed action thriller, Running on Karma, winning him his second Hong Kong Film Award for Best Actor. The same year, Lau directed and starred in his only directorial feature to date, the musical short Love Under the Sun to raise awareness about AIDS and dispel common misconceptions regarding its contagiousness. In 2004, Lau renamed his company, Teamwork Motion Pictures, to Focus Group Holdings Limited, with its first film production being the crime film, Jiang Hu, which he also produced and starred as a triad leader who is a target of an assassination hit. The same year, Lau also made his first venture in the Mainland Chinese film market, starring in the wuxia film, House of Flying Daggers, which premiered at the 2004 Cannes Film Festival, and the action drama A World without Thieves, with the two films being the second and third-highest-grossing films of the year at the Chinese box office respectively. In 2007, he played a drug lord in the crime drama film, Protégé, which won him the Hong Kong Film Award for Best Supporting Actor.

In 2010, Lau played Di Renjie in Tsui Hark's Detective Dee and the Mystery of the Phantom Flame, which was nominated for the Golden Lion at the 2010 Venice Film Festival. The following year, he starred in Ann Hui 's A Simple Life, which won four awards at the 68th Venice Film Festival, as well as earning his third Hong Kong Film Award for Best Actor and second Golden Horse Award for Best Leading Actor. In 2013, Lau produced and starred as morally-conflicted cop in the high-octane action film, Firestorm, which was also the first 3D film production he worked on. In 2016, Lau starred in his first Hollywood film, The Great Wall. In 2017, Lau produced and starred as a righteous bomb disposal officer in Shock Wave, which earned him another Best Actor nomination for at the 27th Hong Kong Film Awards. He returned in 2020 in the thematic sequel, Shock Wave 2, playing a different character greatly contrasting his role from its predecessor, and the film has grossed US$226.4 million worldwide, making it Lau's highest-grossing film at the global box office to date.

Films

Television series

References

 
Lau, Andy
Lau, Andy